Garwood is an unincorporated community in southern Reynolds County, in the U.S. state of Missouri. The community is on Missouri Route 34 and approximately eight miles northeast of Van Buren in adjacent Carter County.

History
A post office called Garwood was established in 1907, and remained in operation until 1954. The community most likely was named after a businessperson in the local logging industry.

References

Unincorporated communities in Reynolds County, Missouri
Unincorporated communities in Missouri